Gerald 'Michael' Sylvester Sichel (born 3 September 1934) is an Australian fencer. He competed at the 1956 and 1960 Summer Olympics.

References

1934 births
Living people
Australian male fencers
Olympic fencers of Australia
Fencers at the 1956 Summer Olympics
Fencers at the 1960 Summer Olympics
Sportspeople from London
Commonwealth Games medallists in fencing
Commonwealth Games silver medallists for Australia
Fencers at the 1958 British Empire and Commonwealth Games
Medallists at the 1958 British Empire and Commonwealth Games